Combretum zeyheri, the large-fruited bushwillow or Zeyher's bushwillow, is a species of flowering plant in the family Combretaceae, usually found growing on acidic or sandy soils in tropical African savannas. A small to medium-sized tree, its roots are used as a source of material for making baskets and as a traditional medicine for haemorrhoids.

References

zeyheri
Flora of the Democratic Republic of the Congo
Flora of East Tropical Africa
Flora of South Tropical Africa
Flora of Southern Africa
Plants described in 1850